Boreofairchildia is a genus of moth flies in the subfamily Bruchomyiinae.  Species have been recorded from the Americas, principally Central and South America, with many, including the type, transferred from the genus Nemopalpus.

Description
The genus name was dedicated to G. B. Fairchild, for his contributions to Neotropical Psychodidae and medical entomology.  "According to cladistics analysis, the diagnostic characters of this genus are: aedeagus as long as or slightly shorter than ejaculatory apodeme and gonocoxites; gonocoxites  without medial appendages, gonostyli basally broad, with two or more distal projections."

Species
Unless referenced otherwise, Systema Dipterorum includes:
 Boreofairchildia alexanderi Santos, Brazil & Pinto, 2021
 Boreofairchildia antillarum (Fairchild, 1952)
 Boreofairchildia arroyoi (León, 1950)
 Boreofairchildia belti Ježek, Oboňa, Pont, Maes & Mollinedo, 2018
 Boreofairchildia dominicana Wagner, 2017
 Boreofairchildia mopani (León, 1950)
 Boreofairchildia moralesi (León, 1950)
 Boreofairchildia multisetosus (Alexander, 1979)
 Boreofairchildia nearctica (Young, 1974) (sugarfoot moth fly)
 Boreofairchildia parvus (Santos, Falqueta & Bravo, 2013)
 Boreofairchildia patriciae (Alexander, 1987)
 Boreofairchildia scheveni (Wagner, 2006)
 Boreofairchildia sziladyi (Tonnoir, 1940) – type species
 Boreofairchildia torrealbai (Ortiz & Scorza, 1963)
 Boreofairchildia youngi (Wagner, 2000)
 Boreofairchildia yucatanensis (Vargas & Díaz Nájera, 1958)

References

External links
 
 Catalogue of Life listing (retrieved 20 June 2021)

Nematocera genera
Diptera of South America
Psychodidae